Eduardo Antonio Commisso (born 29 July 1948 in Avellaneda) is a former Argentine football midfielder who won the Copa Libertadores with Independiente on four consecutive occasions. He also played for Hércules CF of Spain.

Career
Commisso began playing for his home town club Independiente in 1968. He made 208 league appearances for the club and a further 23 in international tournaments. During his time as an Independiente player the club won two league titles, four consecutive Copa Libertadores and the Copa Intercontinental 1973.

In 1975, he joined Hércules CF where he played 40 times, scoring 3 goals. In 1978, he returned to Argentina and had brief stints with Chacarita Juniors and Estudiantes de La Plata.

Titles
Independiente
Copa Intercontinental (1): Copa Intercontinental 1973
Copa Libertadores (4): 1972, 1973, 1974, 1975
Primera División Argentina (2): Metropolitano 1970 Metropolitano 1971
Copa Interamericana (2): 1972, 1974

External links
 BDFA profile
 Eduardo Commisso habló del pasado y el presente de Independiente at La Capital MdP

1948 births
Living people
Sportspeople from Avellaneda
Argentine footballers
Association football midfielders
Club Atlético Independiente footballers
Chacarita Juniors footballers
Estudiantes de La Plata footballers
La Liga players
Hércules CF players
Argentine Primera División players
Argentine expatriate footballers
Expatriate footballers in Spain